High Legh is a civil parish in Cheshire East, England. It contains 12 listed buildings, which are designated by English Heritage and recorded in the National Heritage List for England. Of these, two are listed at Grade II*, the middle grade, and the others are at Grade II. Apart from the village of High Legh, the parish is mainly rural. Most of the listed buildings are houses, cottages, and farmhouses, some of them dating back to the 16th and 17th centuries, and timber-framed. The other listed buildings are a chapel and a church.

Key

Buildings

See also

Listed buildings in Antrobus
Listed buildings in Appleton
Listed buildings in Aston by Budworth
Listed buildings in Lymm
Listed buildings in Mere
Listed buildings in Millington

References
Citations

Sources

 

Listed buildings in the Borough of Cheshire East
Lists of listed buildings in Cheshire